The Jacob Crouse Inn is a historic inn located at Guilderland in Albany County, New York.  The original building was built about 1833 and is a rectangular structure with a gable roof.  Around 1870 it was enlarged with the addition of a central gable wing and one story porch.  It features a large square cupola at the intersection of the gable roofs.

It was listed on the National Register of Historic Places in 1982.

References

Hotel buildings on the National Register of Historic Places in New York (state)
Hotel buildings completed in 1833
Buildings and structures in Albany County, New York
National Register of Historic Places in Albany County, New York